Telestes miloradi  is a species of freshwater fish in the family Cyprinidae.
It is endemic the Ljuta River in Croatia.

References

Telestes
Fish described in 2012